The Holy Infants Embracing is  a lost painting   attributed to Leonardo da Vinci. It represents the infant Christ embracing his cousin John the Baptist. The subject matter relates to the two paintings of the Virgin of the Rocks by Leonardo and numerous other Renaissance works by Raphael and others of the meeting of the two children on the road to Egypt while escaping the Massacre of the Innocents.

History 

The subject of two Infants kissing was an inspirational source of quite a few (about thirty) copies of pupils and followers of Leonardo da Vinci. An early sketch of the subject by Leonardo himself is held at Windsor in the Royal collection. The sheet shows various studies of Madonna and Baby playing with the cat, while at the very bottom we see two infants kissing and embracing each other. The sketch is quite different from the version presented at numerous compositions, while the baby on the right is shown in a very same pose as Jesus in Virgin of the Rocks. 

The connection between those paintings is evident in two copies made by Marco d'Oggiono (one of them - the Thuelin Madonna) and copy made by Bernardino dei Conti (lost during World War II). Madonna, very much like as the one depicted in Virgin of the Rocks is seen blessing two kissing children, representing Jesus and St John the Baptist. 
Other copies show half-length figure of Madonna leaning over the table with figures of embracing children (like copy by school of Leonardo da Vinci held at Burchill Collection, Milan, and a copy ascribed either to Marco d'Oggiono or Giampietrino). The painting of Holy Family (including holy infants embracing) by Bernardino Luini held at Prado, Madrid shows a similar representation. 
Most of the copies show only the group of two children in a quite different background. These include copies by Marco d'Oggiono, depicting holy children in a background of castle (Milan), grotto, rocky landscape (Windsor collection). The subject of two children kissing was repeated many times by another Leonardo follower, Joos van Cleve, who was called Leonardo des Nordens or "Leonardo of the North":

He often produced almost identical paintings of the subject: like three paintings held respectively at Museo Musei vicino Matteo Lampertico Arte antica e moderna, Milan; private collection, Switzerland and private collection in USA (showing a very similar background to the Windsor version; also in Royal collection, Brussels, The Art Institute of Chicago and Mauritshuis collection, Hague. Other copies by artist are held also at Naples and Vienna, sold at various auction houses recently. Joos van Cleve is responsible for introducing the composition among artists of Northern Europe, while numerous copies today are ascribed to the followers of Joos van Cleve.

References

 73B832 search for iconclass code "the Christ-child and John the Baptist (as child)" in RKD

Paintings by Leonardo da Vinci
Paintings depicting Jesus
Lost paintings
Paintings depicting John the Baptist